

Richard S. Van Wagoner (July 23, 1946 – October 10, 2010) was an American historian, audiologist, and author who published works on the history of Utah and the history of the Latter Day Saint movement.

Early life and education 
Van Wagoner was a Lehi, Utah, native and a fifth-generation Mormon. He was an Eagle Scout and was a missionary for the Church of Jesus Christ of Latter-day Saints in the church's Central States Mission. In 1970, he graduated from Brigham Young University with an M.S. degree.

Career 
He was trained as a clinical audiologist and beginning in 1977 operated a hearing center in Salt Lake City, Utah.

Van Wagoner wrote the books Sidney Rigdon: A Portrait of Religious Excess and Mormon Polygamy: A History. His 1994 biography of Sidney Rigdon won awards from the Mormon History Association and the John Whitmer Historical Association.

Van Wagoner was a member of the board of Signature Books, and was described after his death as a "trailblazer in Mormon studies", having published historical articles in Utah Historical Quarterly, Dialogue: A Journal of Mormon Thought, and Sunstone. He lived in Lehi, Utah, and acted as the town's historical archivist.

Personal life 
From the early 1980s, Van Wagoner lost his hearing due to otosclerosis; he received a cochlear implant in 2001, which partially restored his hearing. 

Van Wagoner died unexpectedly at his home in Lehi, Utah, at age 64.

Works 
Books

Articles

 

Sunstone Symposium presentations

Van Wagoner, Richard; Allen D. Roberts (August 27, 1982). "From Grace to Grace"
Bradley, Martha; Richard Van Wagoner (August 23, 1985).
Van Wagoner, Richard S.; Lynne Watkins Jorgensen (August 12, 1995). "The Making of a Mormon Myth: The 1844 Transfiguration of Brigham Young - and - The Mantle of the Prophet Joseph Passes to Brother Brigham and the Twelve Apostles: A Collective Spiritual Witness"
Van Wagoner, Richard S. (August 17, 1996). "Sidney Rigdon and the Elect Sisterhood"
Ehat, Andrew E.; Richard S. Van Wagoner (August 22, 1996). "Pseudo-Polyandry: Explaining Mormon Polgyny's Paraboxical Companion"
Van Wagoner, Richard; Breck England (August 23, 1996). "Orson Pratt, Jr"

Notes

External links 
The Richard S. Van Wagoner Papers (J. Willard Marriott Library, University of Utah)

1946 births
2010 deaths
American historians
Latter Day Saints from Utah
Audiologists
Deaf writers
Historians of the Latter Day Saint movement
American Latter Day Saint writers
People from Lehi, Utah
American Mormon missionaries in the United States
Brigham Young University alumni
Writers from Utah
20th-century Mormon missionaries
American deaf people